Rahmat-un-Nissa (died  1691), better known by her title Nawab Bai (meaning "The Great"), was a secondary wife of the Mughal emperor Aurangzeb. She gave birth to Aurangzeb's first two sons, including Bahadur Shah I, who became Mughal emperor in 1707. Nawab Bai was unpopular at the Mughal court and lost her husband's favour quite early on in her life while the misconduct of her sons, Muhammad Sultan and Muhammad Muazzam, embittered her latter life. She died in 1691 in Delhi after long years of separation from her husband and children.

Family and lineage
There are two conflicting accounts of Nawab Bai's parentage. According to one account, she was the daughter of Raja Tajuddin Khan of the Rajauri State in Kashmir, and belonged to the Jarral clan. 

However, according to the Mughal historian Khafi Khan, she was the daughter of a Muslim saint named Syed Shah Mir, a descendant of Abdul-Qadir Gilani, who had taken to a life of retirement among the hills of Rajauri. The Raja of Rajauri, who became close to this holy man, offered him his daughter in marriage. Syed Shah Mir accepted and they became parents to a son and a daughter. Then the saint went on a pilgrimage to Mecca, where all trace of him was lost. When Shah Jahan later demanded from the Raja a tribute of money, and a daughter of his house, the Raja sent him this granddaughter, Nawab Bai, who was noted for her beauty, goodness and intelligence. According to modern historians, she was given this false pedigree in order to give Bahadur Shah a right to call himself a Sayyid.

Marriage
In the imperial harem, she was taught languages and culture by a set of masters, governesses, and Persian women versed in court manners, and in 1638 she was married to Aurangzeb becoming his secondary wife. After her marriage, she was given the name Rahmat-un-Nissa.

A year later, she gave birth to Aurangzeb's first son, Prince Muhammad Sultan Mirza. He was born on 29 December 1639, at Mathura. Over the next eight years, she gave birth to two more children. They were Prince Muhammad Muazzam Mirza (future Emperor Bahadur Shah I), and the memorizer of the Quran, Princess Badr-un-Nissa Begum. 

Although she had given birth to Aurangzeb's first son, still his first wife, the Persian princess, Dilras Banu Begum, remained his chief consort as well as his favourite.

Aurangzeb's reign
The misconduct of her sons, Muhammad Sultan and Muhammad Muazzam, disrupted her latter life. In the war of succession in 1659, her eldest son Muhammad Sultan joined his uncle, Shah Shuja, and married his daughter Gulrukh Banu Begum. However, he soon left the prince, and returned to his father in February 1660. On Aurangzeb's orders he was put under arrest and was sent to Salimgarh fort, and was later transferred to Gwalior fort in 1661.

In 1662, during Aurangzeb's illness, his sister Roshanara Begum, took charge of him and would not allow anyone except her own confidants, to see him. Believing that there was no hope of her brother's surviving, Roshanara took charge of the state. She even stole Aurangzeb's signet ring and forged a decree to deny his eldest son by his wife Nawab Bai any chance of succession. When Nawab Bai learned of this and complained, Roshanara became angry, seized her by hair and dragged her out of Aurangzeb's chamber. After Aurangzeb's recovery, Roshanara claimed that the decree she wrote on his behalf was to prevent a conspiracy against him and to prevent chaos of succession during his illness. This wise defense protected Roshanara from Aurangzeb's anger or suspicion. Although Roshanara continued to abuse the trust and power bestowed upon her by Aurangzeb, especially during his absence in battle, when he put her in charge of affairs in Delhi, she fell out of favor with Aurangzeb and fell from power at the end of 1667, and their elder sister Jahanara Begum again became the head of the harem, trusted counsel and the most powerful woman in the empire as Badshah Begum.

In 1669, a man named Abdullah submitted a petition to Nawab Bai, that after the dismissal of his son, the post of faujdar of Arandole be granted to him. But when the matter was submitted to Aurangzeb, it was rejected. 

In 1670, Muhammad Muazzam had been instigated by the flatterers to act in a self-willed and independent manner. When Aurangzeb's letter of advice produced no effect, he summoned Nawab Bai from Delhi, in order to send her to her son to rectify his behaviour. She reached Sikandra in April 1670, where Muhammad Akbar, Bakshimulk Asad Khan and Bahramand Khan conducted her to the imperial harem. In May 1670, she started for Aurangabad, and was commanded to spend two days at Gwalior, with her son Muhammad Sultan. After staying there for sometime, Sarbuland Khan escorted her to Muhammad Muazzam.

In 1686, she met the famous Italian writer and traveller, Niccolao Manucci at Goa, who claimed that have bleed Nawab Bai twice a year. 

In 1687, Muhammad Muazzam suspected of contumacy with Sultan Abul Hasan, the ruler of Golkonda. Her advice and even personal entreaty had no effect on him, and at last on Aurangzeb's orders he was placed under arrest. Muazzam's sons, and his first wife and chief consort Nur-un-Nissa Begum were also imprisoned in separate jails.

Nawab Bai is known to have built a serai at Fardapur, at the foot of the pass, and also founded Baijipura, a suburb of Aurangabad.

Death
She died in Delhi before the middle of 1691, after long years of separation from her husband and children. Aurangzeb along with his daughter Zinat-un-Nissa came to Muhammad Muazzam in order to condole him.

References

Bibliography
 
 
 
 

1623 births
1691 deaths
Women of the Mughal Empire
Indian queen consorts
Mughal nobility
Indian female royalty
17th-century Indian women
17th-century Indian people
Wives of Aurangzeb
Mothers of Mughal emperors